Enoch Kelly Haney (November 12, 1940 – April 23, 2022) was an American politician and internationally recognized Seminole/Muscogee artist from Oklahoma, He served as principal chief of the Seminole Nation of Oklahoma from 2005 until 2009 and previously served as a member of both houses of the Oklahoma Legislature. He created a bronze statue that sits atop the Oklahoma State Capitol, called The Guardian. Another statue he created is located at the Chickasaw Nation headquarters in Ada, Oklahoma.

Haney was also a candidate for the office of Governor of Oklahoma in the 2002 election.

Early life and education
Enoch Kelly Haney was born on November 12, 1940, in Seminole, Oklahoma, to William Woodrow Haney and Hattie Louise Haney. His father was a flute maker and craftsman and his paternal grandfather, Willie Haney, contributed to the Smithsonian Institution's oral history project and served as Chief of the Seminole Tribe in the 1940s. Haney graduated from Prairie Valley High School in Earlsboro, Oklahoma in 1959, then went on to earn an Associate of Arts degree from Bacone College in Muskogee, Oklahoma and a Bachelor of Fine Arts degree from Oklahoma City University. He attended the University of Arizona on a Rockefeller Foundation Scholarship. He also served in the Oklahoma National Guard. In 1972, he was named as one of the Outstanding Young Men of America. Before he entered politics, he was a Methodist minister.

Political career

Prior to becoming Principal Chief of the Seminole Nation of Oklahoma in 2005, Haney served in the Oklahoma Senate from 1986 to 2002. During his tenure in the State Senate, he served as Chairman of the Senate Appropriations Committee. From 1980 to 1986, he served in the Oklahoma House of Representatives, becoming Vice Chairman of the House Appropriations Committee in his second term. He was the first full-blood Native American to serve in either house of the Oklahoma Legislature. Earlier in his career, he had served the Seminole Nation of Oklahoma, as a tribal councilman, band chief, business consultant, and planner.

Haney ran in the Democratic Party's primary election in the 2002 Oklahoma gubernatorial election. He placed third in the primary.

Artistic career
In addition to his political career, Haney was an internationally recognized Native American artist, specializing in paintings and sculpture. He painted in oil, acrylic, and watercolor and drew with pastels, as well as sculpting with bronze. Haney was shown throughout the United States, as well as Malaysia, Singapore, South Korea, and Switzerland. The Five Civilized Tribes Museum declared him a Master Artist in 1976.

Most notably, he created "The Guardian," a 22-foot bronze sculpture which adorns the Oklahoma State Capitol dome. Modeled after Haney's own relatives, "The Guardian" took 10 months to complete, weighs 4,000 pounds, and was erected on June 7, 2002. Seven 7-foot replicas of the statue are located throughout the state. Haney's other artistic accomplishments include the "Chickasaw Warrior" sculpture at the Chickasaw Nation headquarters in Ada, Oklahoma, and the "Standing His Ground" sculpture at Seminole State College in Seminole, Oklahoma.

A painting by Haney, "The Earth and I are One" is displayed at the Oklahoma State Capitol.

Other accomplishments
Haney produced and hosted his own weekly television program. He also narrated and worked as a consultant for the Seminole series of the Discovery Channel's 1993 television documentary series, "How the West was Lost." He taught at Oklahoma City University and  owned an art gallery, Haney, Inc.

See also
Five Civilized Tribes Museum
Oklahoma State Capitol
Seminole Nation of Oklahoma
 Muscogee (Creek) Nation

References

External links
Kelly Haney Official Website
 Voices of Oklahoma interview. First person interview conducted on July 20, 2011, with Enoch Kelly Haney.
Oral History Interview with Enoch Kelly Haney

1940 births
2022 deaths
20th-century American politicians
21st-century American politicians
20th-century Native American politicians
21st-century Native American politicians
American United Methodist clergy
Bacone College alumni
Candidates in the 2002 United States elections
Democratic Party Oklahoma state senators
Democratic Party members of the Oklahoma House of Representatives
Methodists from Oklahoma
Native American Christians
Native American leaders
Native American painters
Native American sculptors
Seminole Nation of Oklahoma state legislators in Oklahoma
Oklahoma City University alumni
Oklahoma National Guard personnel
People from Pottawatomie County, Oklahoma
People from Seminole, Oklahoma
Sculptors from Oklahoma
Seminole Nation of Oklahoma politicians
University of Arizona alumni